The Lawrence Park Dinor is a Silk City diner in Lawrence Park Township, Erie County in U.S. state of Pennsylvania. It was opened in 1948, and has operated since then. The previous owner George Gourlias got the diner listed on the National Register of Historic Places in 2004. The spelling "dinor" is unique to northwestern Pennsylvania, and its origin is largely unknown.

Design 
The Lawrence Park Dinor is located in Lawrence Park Township, outside of Erie, Pennsylvania, on Main Street in a  lot. Because of the property's narrow size, the diner is oriented perpendicular to the street. A cottage erected at the same time as the diner sits at the rear of the lot, and served as the living quarters for the diner's original owners. 

The Lawrence Park Dinor was manufactured by Silk City Diners, a division of the Patterson Vehicle Company, in Paterson, New Jersey. Its exterior is a white, porcelain enamel with a fluted, stainless steel band "sandwiched by two narrow strips of blue". A monitor roof runs the length of the diner, a feature that was common in diner design until the 1950s.

The building's two entrances, one at the end of the diner and another at its middle, are both fronted by stainless steel doors, each with a large, oval window. The interior of the diner is laid out in a counter–aisle–booth seating configuration with 16 seats at the counter, 5 booths, and a free-standing table. The vaulted ceiling is made up of curved, porcelain panels.

History 
The Lawrence Park Dinor was manufactured at the Silk City factory and transported to its present location in 1948. Its first owners, Harold Curtis and his wife, purchased the diner to serve the community of Lawrence Park. As the majority of people in Lawrence Park were employed by General Electric  from the diner, a fast and inexpensive eating establishment was in demand. The unusual spelling of "dinor" is found only in northwestern Pennsylvania and its origin is speculated to have been a typographical error that was never corrected, or a variant derived from the German language. In 1930, three out of five diners in Erie used the spelling; by 1958 it was used by over 90 percent of diners in Erie. 

The diner was listed on the National Register of Historic Places on March 18, 2004, by George Gourlias with the help of Lawrence Park Historical Society Member Virginia Anderson. The current owners took over the diner in 2010. The Lawrence Park Dinor is known for its famous "Greek sauce"—a (brought to the menu by former owner George Gourlias 1991-2010) spiced, ground beef mixture popular in Erie as a topping on French fries (known elsewhere as "Texas hot sauce" for its use as a chili dog topping).

See also 
 List of diners
 National Register of Historic Places listings in Erie County, Pennsylvania
 Village Diner, prominent Silk City diner

References

Sources 

 
 

Buildings and structures in Erie County, Pennsylvania
Commercial buildings on the National Register of Historic Places in Pennsylvania
Commercial buildings completed in 1948
Diners on the National Register of Historic Places
Diners in Pennsylvania
National Register of Historic Places in Erie County, Pennsylvania
Restaurants in Pennsylvania
Tourist attractions in Erie County, Pennsylvania
Restaurants established in 1948